The following outline is provided as an overview of and topical guide to Madhya Pradesh:

Madhya Pradesh – meaning "Central Province", is a state in central India. Its capital is Bhopal and the largest city is Indore. Nicknamed the "heart of India" due to its geographical location in India, Madhya Pradesh is the second-largest state in the country by area.  Rich in mineral resources, MP has the largest reserves of diamond and copper in India.

General reference

Names 
 Common English name: Madhya Pradesh
 Pronunciation: , 
 Official English name(s): Madhya Pradesh
 Nickname(s): 
 Adjectival(s): Madhya Pradeshi
 Demonym(s): Madhya Pradeshis

Rankings (amongst India's states) 

 by population: 5th
 by area (2011 census): 2nd  
 by crime rate (2015): 2nd
 by gross domestic product (GDP) (2014): 9th
by Human Development Index (HDI): 
by life expectancy at birth: 
by literacy rate:

Geography of Madhya Pradesh 

Geography of Madhya Pradesh
 Madhya Pradesh is: an Indian state
 Population of Madhya Pradesh: 72,597,565 (2011)
 Area of Madhya Pradesh: 308,245 km2 (119,014 sq mi)
 Atlas of Madhya Pradesh

Location of Madhya Pradesh 
 Madhya Pradesh is situated within the following regions:
 Northern Hemisphere
 Eastern Hemisphere
 Eurasia
 Asia
 South Asia
 India
 Time zone:  Indian Standard Time (UTC+05:30)

Environment of Madhya Pradesh 

 Wildlife of Madhya Pradesh
 Flora of Madhya Pradesh

Natural geographic features of Madhya Pradesh 

 Rivers of Madhya Pradesh

Regions of Madhya Pradesh

Ecoregions of Madhya Pradesh

Administrative divisions of Madhya Pradesh

Districts of Madhya Pradesh 

 Districts of Madhya Pradesh

Municipalities of Madhya Pradesh 

 Cities of Madhya Pradesh
 Capital of Madhya Pradesh: Capital of Madhya Pradesh

Demography of Madhya Pradesh 

Demographics of Madhya Pradesh

Government and politics of Madhya Pradesh 

Politics of Madhya Pradesh

 Form of government: Indian state government (parliamentary system of representative democracy)
 Capital of Madhya Pradesh: Bhopal
 Elections in Madhya Pradesh

Union government in Madhya Pradesh 
 Rajya Sabha members from Madhya Pradesh
 Madhya Pradesh Pradesh Congress Committee
 Indian general election, 2009 (Madhya Pradesh)

Branches of the government of Madhya Pradesh 

Government of Madhya Pradesh

Executive branch of the government of Madhya Pradesh 

 Head of state: Governor of Madhya Pradesh, 
 Head of government: Chief Minister of Madhya Pradesh,

Legislative branch of the government of Madhya Pradesh 

Madhya Pradesh Legislative Assembly
 Constituencies of Madhya Pradesh Legislative Assembly

Judicial branch of the government of Madhya Pradesh

Law and order in Madhya Pradesh

History of Madhya Pradesh 

History of Madhya Pradesh

History of Madhya Pradesh, by period

Prehistoric Madhya Pradesh

Ancient Madhya Pradesh

Medieval Madhya Pradesh

Colonial Madhya Pradesh

Contemporary Madhya Pradesh

History of Madhya Pradesh, by region

History of Madhya Pradesh, by subject

Culture of Madhya Pradesh 

Culture of Madhya Pradesh
 Architecture of Madhya Pradesh
 Cuisine of Madhya Pradesh
 Monuments in Madhya Pradesh
 Monuments of National Importance in Madhya Pradesh
 State Protected Monuments in Madhya Pradesh
 World Heritage Sites in Madhya Pradesh

Art in Madhya Pradesh 

 Music of Madhya Pradesh

People of Madhya Pradesh 

 People from Madhya Pradesh

Religion in Madhya Pradesh 

Religion in Madhya Pradesh
 Christianity in Madhya Pradesh

Sports in Madhya Pradesh 

Sports in Madhya Pradesh
 Cricket in Madhya Pradesh
 Madhya Pradesh Cricket Association
 Madhya Pradesh cricket team
 Football in Madhya Pradesh
 Madhya Pradesh football team

Symbols of Madhya Pradesh 

Symbols of Madhya Pradesh
 State animal:बारहसिंहा
 State bird:दूधराज
 State flower:सफेद लिली
 State seal: Seal of Madhya Pradesh _ 
 State tree: साल

Economy and infrastructure of Madhya Pradesh 

Economy of Madhya Pradesh
 Madhya Pradesh Stock Exchange
 Tourism in Madhya Pradesh
 Transport in Madhya Pradesh
 Airports in Madhya Pradesh
 Rail transport in Madhya Pradesh

Education in Madhya Pradesh 

Education in Madhya Pradesh
 Institutions of higher education in Madhya Pradesh

Health in Madhya Pradesh

See also 

 Outline of India

References

External links 

 
 MP Government Portal
 Provisional Population Totals – 2011 Census of India: Madhya Pradesh

Madhya Pradesh
Madhya Pradesh